Alfred Day may refer to:

 Alf Day (1907–1997), Welsh footballer
 Alf Day (Australian footballer) (1884–1968), Australian rules footballer
 Alfred Day (jockey) (1830–1868), British jockey
 Alfred Day (music theorist) (1810–1849), English music theorist
 Alfred Norwood Day (1868–1939), South Australian railways official